The Central Park Historic District (also known as Estates of South Palm Beach) is a U.S. historic district (designated as such on July 28, 1999) located in West Palm Beach, Florida. The district runs roughly along SR 805 and South Olive Avenue, from Monroe Drive to Southern Boulevard. It contains 155 historic buildings.

References

External links

 Palm Beach County listings at National Register of Historic Places

National Register of Historic Places in Palm Beach County, Florida
Historic districts on the National Register of Historic Places in Florida
West Palm Beach, Florida
Historic districts in Palm Beach County, Florida